Trinity is an album by American mult-instrumentalist and composer Joe McPhee recorded in 1972 and originally released on the CjR label, then reissued by Atavistic in 2001.

Reception

The Allmusic review by Thom Jurek stated "On Trinity, the listener travels the history of sound through time and space. All that's left to do is nod silently in affirmation or weep and gnash your teeth in defeat. Revelatory. Glorious". On All About Jazz writer Derek Taylor noted "McPhee states that Trinity was the first record where he really began to feel comfortable with his tenor playing. Drinking in his work on each of his horns over the duration of the album it’s startling how much of McPhee the mature player is already solidly in place and his explanation takes on new candor".

Track listing 
All compositions by Joe McPhee, Mike Krull and Harold E. Smith except as indicated
 "Ionization" - 28:41
 "Astral Spirits" (McPhee) - 10:42
 "Delta" - 16:19

Personnel 
Joe McPhee - tenor saxophone, soprano saxophone, trumpet, cornet
Mike Krull - piano, electric piano
Harold E. Smith - percussion

References 

Joe McPhee live albums
1972 live albums
Atavistic Records live albums